"Our House" is a song written by British singer-songwriter Graham Nash and recorded by Crosby, Stills, Nash & Young on their album Déjà Vu (1970). The single reached No. 30 on the U.S. Billboard Hot 100 and No. 20 on the Cash Box Top 100. The song, "an ode to countercultural domestic bliss", was written while Nash was living with Joni Mitchell, recording both Crosby, Stills & Nash and Déjà Vu.

Origins 

The song originated from a domestic event that took place while Graham Nash was living with Joni Mitchell (and her two cats) in her house in Laurel Canyon (Los Angeles), after they had gone out for breakfast and had bought an inexpensive vase on Ventura Boulevard. Nash wrote the song in an hour, on Mitchell's piano.

In October 2013, in an interview with Terry Gross on NPR's Fresh Air, Nash elaborated:

Well, it's an ordinary moment. What happened is that Joni [Mitchell] and I – I don't know whether you know anything about Los Angeles, but on Ventura Boulevard in the Valley, there's a very famous deli called Art's Deli. And we'd been to breakfast there. We're going to get into Joan's car, and we pass an antique store. And we're looking in the window, and she saw a very beautiful vase that she wanted to buy ... I persuaded her to buy this vase. It wasn't very expensive, and we took it home.

It was a very grey, kind of sleety, drizzly L.A. morning. And we got to the house in Laurel Canyon, and I said – got through the front door and I said, you know what? I'll light a fire. Why don't you put some flowers in that vase that you just bought? Well, she was in the garden getting flowers. That meant she was not at her piano, but I was ... And an hour later 'Our House' was born, out of an incredibly ordinary moment that many, many people have experienced.

In the same interview, Nash was asked about the harmonies in the song: "It's me and David [Crosby] and Stephen [Stills] doing our best. That's all we ever do. You know, we're lucky enough to be able to do, you know, anything that we want to do, musically. And, you know, these two guys are incredible musicians. Crosby is one of the most unique musicians I know, and Stephen Stills has got this blues-based, South American kind of feeling to his music. And I'm this, you know, Henry VIII guy from England ... You know, it's not supposed to work, but it does, somehow".

Reception
Cash Box described the song as "a jewellike ballad that spotlights the quartet's vocal quality by nearly absenting rhythmic impetus" and highlighted the song's "crystalline performance."

Music video 
Directed and animated by Jeff Scher, an official music video for this song was published on CSNY's official YouTube channel on June 9, 2021.

Legacy and adaptations 
Graham Nash once admitted that he was "bored with 'Our House' the day after [he] recorded it", but will play it occasionally "because it does mean so much to so many people". It is praised for its "innocent elegance", though Barney Hoskyns called it a "trite ditty" and wondered what Neil Young, whose protest song "Ohio" was recorded and released by CSNY in June 1970, would have thought of it: "the journey from 'Ohio' back to 'Our House' seemed to sum up a general failure of nerve in the LA music scene".

The song has been covered by a number of artists, including Helen Reddy, The Onyx, Phantom Planet, Sheena Easton, Kidsongs and Sharon, Lois & Bram.

It was used as a commercial jingle for Eckrich sausage in the 1980s, and for Sears Kenmore appliance advertisements in 1989. It has appeared in various television shows and films. It was also used in an advert for Halifax Building Society in the 1990s.

Dan Aykroyd sings along to the song while cleaning the house in one of the opening scenes of the 1994 film My Girl 2. A portion of the song's lyrics were spoken in The Simpsons episode “Bart After Dark” by Reverend Lovejoy, as well as played in the episode “Milhouse of Sand and Fog”, while Milhouse is daydreaming. It appears in the 1996 Only Fools and Horses Christmas special, Time on Our Hands, watched by 24.3 million viewers in the United Kingdom. The song was featured in the fifth season of How I Met Your Mother in an episode called "Home Wreckers". It appeared as a cover in a Target commercial from 2013, for its "Threshold" brand for house and home. It was the closing song on The Blacklist episode "Marvin Gerard", aired in 2015. An episode of Cheers titled “Dinner at Eight-ish” had Frasier Crane and Lilith singing it in honor of their new apartment, only to stop very abruptly when Diane chimed in. In the fourth season of This is Us, Rebecca, in parallel scenes with her husband Jack and her son Kevin, visits the old home of Joni Mitchell in Los Angeles and relays the story of how “Our House” came to be a song. Rebecca, played by Mandy Moore, and Jack, played by Milo Ventimiglia sing a portion of the song.

Nash performs the song on the album Joni 75: A Birthday Celebration, a recording of a tribute concert by a number of artists to celebrate Mitchell's 75th birthday, released on Decca in March 2019.

Charts

Weekly charts

Year-end charts

Certifications

Personnel
Graham Nash – lead vocals, piano, harpsichord
David Crosby – harmony vocals
Stephen Stills – harmony vocals
Dallas Taylor – drums
Greg Reeves – bass

References

Notes

Bibliography

External links
 Lyrics of this song
 

1970 songs
1970 singles
Crosby, Stills, Nash & Young songs
Songs written by Graham Nash
Atlantic Records singles
Laurel Canyon, Los Angeles